William Leete Stone may refer to either of two American authors and historians:
 William Leete Stone, Sr. (1792-1844)
 William Leete Stone, Jr. (1835-1908)